Wild Life is a 1918 American silent Western film directed by Henry Otto and written by Charles J. Wilson Jr. and M. V. Dearing.  The film stars William Desmond, Josie Sedgwick, and Ed Brady.

Cast list

References

External links
 

1918 films
1918 Western (genre) films
Films directed by Henry Otto
Silent American Western (genre) films
1910s American films